Sabara may refer to:

People 
Śabara, Indian philosopher
Daryl Sabara (born 1992), American actor

Places 
Sabará, a municipality in Brazil
Sabara Bangou, a village in the north of the rural commune of Tondikiwindi (also Tondi Kiwindi), Ouallam Department, Tillabéri Region in southwestern Niger

Plants 
Jabuticaba, the Brazilian grape tree, also known as "Sabará"